Stewart Island Flights is a small New Zealand airline offering scheduled flights with light aircraft between Invercargill and Stewart Island. It also operates charter services to several of the island’s beaches. Since 2000 (when Southern Air (1997) was acquired) South East Air Ltd, founded by Raymond Hector and Bill Moffatt in 1993, has been the parent company and holder of the Air Operator Certificate (AOC) under which Stewart Island Flights and Invercargill Aircraft Maintenance operate.

Services 
Stewart Island Flights operates thrice-daily scheduled flights between Invercargill Airport and Ryan's Creek Aerodrome on Stewart Island. During the summer months (October to the end of April), there are often more flights scheduled as the demand increases.
Scenic flights operate on an ad hoc basis around Stewart Island and the Southland Region.

Stewart Island Flights often operate to Mason Bay on the western side of Stewart Island, landing at four different locations on the bay: Duck Creek, Martin's Creek, Cavalier and Kilbride. Other beaches serviced by Stewart Island Flights include Doughboy Bay, Little Hellfire Beach, West Ruggedy Beach, Sealers Bay (Codfish Island) and Smoky Beach. Stewart Island Flights occasionally land and service the airstrip at Dog Island, an island 5 kilometres east of Bluff.

South East Air commenced an IFR post run from Invercargill to Dunedin and return on 4 June 1996 using a Piper PA-32 Cherokee Six. The post run concluded in 2011. At the time, South East Air was one of two companies in New Zealand that commercially operated single-engine piston aircraft at night under IFR. In New Zealand, single-engine piston aircraft are not allowed to be operated under IFR for Air Transport Operations (ATOs) but may be used for Commercial Transport Operations (CTOs), which South East Air utilized on their post-run contract.

Currently, Stewart Island Flights predominantly operate under VFR (Visual Flight Rules) although they have the capability to operate under IFR (Instrument Flight Rules).

Fleet
As of May 2019 the Stewart Island Flights fleet consists of the following aircraft:

References

External links
 Stewart Island Flights

Airlines of New Zealand
Stewart Island
Foveaux Strait
Airlines established in 2000
New Zealand companies established in 2000